Tropang Trumpo (Tagalog for Troop of Tops) is a Philippine sketch comedy show produced by ABC-5 (later known as TV5), a one-hour comedy program that featured gags, spoofs and lampoons, was known to be the "mother" of all local gag shows. It was the show that started it all, so to speak, and paved the way for all the comedy shows that followed thereafter. It was aired from March 12, 1994, until March 13, 1999, when it was replaced by Ispup.

History
Its original cast included Ogie Alcasid, Michael V., Gelli de Belen, and theatre/voice actors Noni Buencamino, Manny Castañeda, Earl Ignacio, Sheilou Bharwani, Mhalou Crisologo, Ana Abad Santos and Lorna Gay Long. Tropa aired on Saturday nights and was originally directed by Jose Javier Reyes.  However, when Reyes became busy with movies, former Goin' Bananas cast members Edgar "Bobot" Mortiz, Al Tantay and former Goin' Bananas headwriter Dan Salamante came in and assumed the respective posts of director and writers.  Mortiz, Tantay and Salamante introduced new segments for the show, the most famous was Battle of the Brainless, a satirical quiz show sketch parodying the 90s game show Battle of the Brains aired over RPN, where simple quiz questions are never answered. The show went on even when two of its main cast, Michael V. and Ogie Alcasid, left in 1995 to do another gag show for GMA entitled Bubble Gang. It was then that Maoi Roca and Smokey Manoloto joined the show with Gelli de Belen, Carmina Villaroel and Earl Ignacio. The show won as Best Gag Show during the 1995 Star Awards for Television and received regional acclaim as "Highly Commended" in the Best Comedy Programme or Series in the 1996 Asian Television Awards held in Singapore.

Tropang Trumpo started to decline when several new shows started copying its format. In 1997, however, Tropang Trumpo was reformatted again and introduced a new powerful ensemble led by the ever-loyal Smokey Manoloto, Sunshine Cruz and Keempee de Leon. Backing up the main cast were Cholo Escano, Cheska Garcia, Meryll Soriano, Sherilyn Reyes and Marco McKinley. In late 1997 former cast members Gelli de Belen and Carmina Villaroel joined the show. In early 1998, the show had to reformat after Edgar Mortiz, Al Tantay and Dan Salamante left due to conflict with ABC executives. At the same time, cast members Smokey Manaloto and Keempee de Leon also left to side with their beleaguered director. Mortiz, Tantay, Salamante, Manaloto and de Leon, along with former cast member Earl Ignacio transferred to IBC where they did a new gag show entitled Goin' Bayabas, a spin-off of the 80's gag show Goin' Bananas. To keep "Tropa" afloat the ABC management named Ding Bolanos as Mortiz's replacement and surviving lead cast members Gelli de Belen, Carmina Villaroel and Candy Pangilinan lead the show. In mid-1998 de Belen and Villaroel left the show again as the management decided to reformat the show. Among the new cast members joining the show in the reformat were Anjanette Abayari, Lindsay Custodio, Daniel Pasia, Blakdyak and Jake Roxas.  It finally closed at the end of the year and was replaced with Ispup.

The show was reaired from January 6 to November 17, 2001, every Saturdays on the same network airing in 1 hour as Tropang Trumpo: Ang Orig .In 2007, it was reaired again. This time, it joined forces with Wow Mali!, and Ispup in the show named Comedy Bites, also aired in Saturdays.

A new show entitled Tropa Moko Unli was launched on September 14, 2013, as a part of the Weekend Do It Better programming block on TV5, combining the former shows Tropang Trumpo and Lokomoko U.

Cast
 Ogie Alcasid 
 Michael V. 
 Gelli de Belen 
 Carmina Villarroel 
 Earl Ignacio 
 Nonie Buencamino 
 Shielu Bharwani 
 Manny Castañeda 
 Ana Abad Santos 
 Malou Crisologo 
 Jomari Yllana 
 Mark Anthony Fernandez 
 Eric Fructuoso 
 Whitney Tyson 
 Smokey Manaloto 
 Maoi Roca 
 Maricel Morales 
 Diego "Binoy" Salvador 
 Ariel "Hyubs" Azarcon 
 Jennifer Mendoza 
 Caloy Alde 
 Marco Mckinley 
 Leandro Baldemor 
 Meryll Soriano 
 Gary Estrada 
 Sunshine Cruz 
 Keempee de Leon 
 Cholo Escano 
 Sherilyn Reyes 
 Cheska Garcia 
 Candy Pangilinan 
 Kevin Vernal 
 Onemig Bondoc 
 Raffy Rodriguez 
 Anjanette Abayari 
 Blakdyak 
 Daniel Pasia 
 Jake Roxas 
 Lindsay Custodio 
 Novia 
 Rufa Mae Quinto

Directors
 Jose Javier Reyes
 Al Quinn
 Deo Directo
 Edgar Mortiz
 Al Tantay (Writer)
 Dan Salamante (Headwriter/Musical Director)

Recurring characters and segments

Recurring Segments
 Ana Luha 
 Ano Daw?
 Bahaw: Ang Kaning Lamig/Ikalawang Saing 
 Baliw Balita 
 Battle of the Brainless 
 Brainless Book of World Records 
 Bitoy the Little Boy
 Brainless Name That Tune 
 Cookie da Weathergirl/Cookie da Magician
 Chicken/Caronia Dance
 D' Bugs Baron D'Bate 
 Ediboy Scoreless
 E.R. (Emergency Raw) 
 Ikaw At Ang Bata 
 Hoy!!! Taksi 
 Noon at Ngayon
 Ogag
 Planet of the Ipis 
 PHLEGMS "Starts with a PH, sounds like an F" 
 Stupid Family Feud 
 Supposed to be, Yun Nga! 
 Top Of The Hour Joke News 
 Travel with Claire Deyhins
 Usapang Lashing
 Wow Mali! 
 X-Treme Baha Stir Olympics

Recurring characters
 David Semplang/Dave May Sheldan (a parody of David Celdran) - played by Ogie Alcasid and Smokey Manaloto
 Tina Monsoor Kalma (a parody of Tina Monzon-Palma) - played by Carmina Villaroel
 Jose Maria Season (a parody of Atty. Jose C. Sison) - played by Michael V.
 Jopek Season (a parody of Jopet Sison) - played by Ogie Alcasid
 Mike N. Rickett's (a parody of Mike Enriquez and Ronnie Ricketts) - played by Earl Ignacio
 Harem Aguila (a parody of Karen Davila) - played by Carmina Villaroel
 Arnold Camvio (a parody of Arnold Clavio) - played by Smokey Manaloto
 Jesibel Syokoy (a parody of Jessica Soho) - played by Gelli De Belen
 Bugs Baron (a parody of Bob Barron) - played by Earl Ignacio
 Tiyo Vanny Kalbo (a parody of Giovanni Calvo) - played by Smokey Manaloto
 Dalian Carnaval (a parody of Dolly Anne Carvajal) - played by Gelli De Belen
 Tina Monsour Del Rosario (a parody of Tina Monzon-Palma and Monsour del Rosario) - played by Carmina Villaroel
 Tonton Bersolo (a parody of Christine Bersola) - played by Earl Ignacio
 Smokiko Headbanger-lista (a parody of Frankie Evangelista) - played by Smokey Manaloto
 Bahaw ang Kaning Lamig characters (a parody of Valiente)
Gelli De B as Bettina - played by Gelli De Belen
Carmina Villaru as Donya Martina - played by Carmina Villaroel
Earl Cio-Igna as Sar. Bayong - played by Earl Ignacio
Smokey Makaloto as Don Vitaliano - played by Smokey Manaloto
Maoi Coca Roca as Gabriel - played by Maoi Roca
Whitney Tutonggi as Clara - played by Whitney Tyson

See also
 List of programs aired by TV5 (Philippine TV network)
 Bubble Gang
 Super Laff-In

References

External links
 

TV5 (Philippine TV network) original programming
1994 Philippine television series debuts
1999 Philippine television series endings
1990s Philippine television series
Philippine comedy television series
Philippine television sketch shows
Filipino-language television shows